Thomas McInally (18 December 1899 – 29 December 1955) was a Scottish footballer who played as a forward.

Career
McInally played for Celtic from 1919 to 1922 and 1925 to 1928, with a spell at Third Lanark in between.

He made 213 appearances and scored 127 goals for Celtic. His career was ultimately a disappointment because of his inability to accept discipline, yet he was generally reckoned to have been one of the most gifted players ever to have worn the green and white of Celtic and he remains extremely popular with their fans.

After leaving for the second time, he played in England for a season with Sunderland. McIally also played twice for the Scotland national team in 1926.

Personal life
His birth name was actually Bernard McInally, but his first name had been changed to Thomas by the time of the 1901 census.

In the 2000s a sympathetic biography was published – "Tommy McInally – Celtic's Bad Bhoy?" by David Potter.

References

External links

1899 births
1955 deaths
Association football forwards
Scottish footballers
Celtic F.C. players
Third Lanark A.C. players
Sunderland A.F.C. players
AFC Bournemouth players
Greenock Morton F.C. players
Derry City F.C. players
Scotland international footballers
Celtic F.C. non-playing staff
Scottish Football League players
St Anthony's F.C. players
Scottish Junior Football Association players
Place of death missing
Scotland junior international footballers
People from Barrhead
English Football League players
Sportspeople from East Renfrewshire